Chippy is a nickname of:

Notable people 
Liam Brady (born 1956), Irish footballer
Chippy Britt (1895–1972), American baseball player in the Negro leagues
Clive Clark (footballer) (1940–2014), English footballer
Peter Frilingos (1944–2004), Australian sports journalist and commentator
Chippy Gaw (1892–1968), American Major League Baseball pitcher in 1920 and college ice hockey head coach
Chippy Gunasekara (1905–1974), first-class cricketer and lawyer from Ceylon
Chris Hipkins (born 1978), the 41st Prime Minister of New Zealand
Chippy McGarr (1863–1904), American baseball player
Harry McNish (1874–1930), carpenter on Sir Ernest Shackleton's Imperial Trans-Antarctic Expedition of 1914–1917
Willie Naughton (1870–1906), Scottish footballer
David "Chippy" Robinson (1897–1967), American Prohibition-era gangster
Chippy Simmons (1878–1937), English footballer

Fictional characters 

 Starlow (referred to as Chippy by Bowser), character in the video game Mario & Luigi: Bowser's Inside Story

See also
Bertha Hill (1905–1950), American blues and vaudeville singer and dancer nicknamed "Chippie"
Chips (nickname)

Lists of people by nickname